Belda Garza (born December 14, 1949) is an American politician who served in the Michigan House of Representatives from the 8th district from 1999 to 2002.

References

1949 births
Living people
Democratic Party members of the Michigan House of Representatives